Al-Masrab (also spelled al-Musareb or el-Mesereb) is a village in eastern Syria, administratively part of the Deir ez-Zor Governorate, located along the Euphrates River, northwest of Deir ez-Zor. Nearby localities include al-Tabni to the northwest, al-Harmushiyah to the north, al-Kasrah to the northeast, al-Saawah to the east and al-Shumaytiyah to the southeast. According to the Syria Central Bureau of Statistics, al-Masrab had a population of 4,833 in the 2004 census.

References

Populated places in Deir ez-Zor District
Populated places on the Euphrates River
Villages in Syria